Dick Hafer (May 29, 1927 – December 15, 2012) was an American jazz tenor saxophonist born in Wyomissing, Pennsylvania.

Hafer began playing clarinet at age seven and switched to tenor sax in high school. His first professional gig was with Charlie Barnet's orchestra in 1949. He played with Claude Thornhill from 1949 to 1950 before returning briefly to play with Barnet again. After this he played with Woody Herman (1951–55), Tex Beneke (1955), Bobby Hackett (1957–58), Elliot Lawrence (1958–60), and Benny Goodman (1962). In 1963 he recorded on two Charles Mingus albums.

In 1974 he moved to Los Angeles and worked mostly as a studio musician. He released two albums under his own name in the 1990s. Hafer died in La Costa, California.

Discography

As leader
In a Sentimental Mood (Progressive, 1991)
Prez Impressions (Fresh Sound, 1994)

As sideman
With Johnny Hartman
The Voice That Is! (Impulse!, 1964)
With Herbie Mann
Salute to the Flute (Epic, 1957)
With Charles Mingus
Mingus Mingus Mingus Mingus Mingus (Impulse!, 1963)
The Black Saint and the Sinner Lady (Impulse!, 1963)

References

[ Dick Hafer] at Allmusic

1927 births
2012 deaths
People from Wyomissing, Pennsylvania
American jazz saxophonists
American male saxophonists
Jazz musicians from Pennsylvania
American male jazz musicians
20th-century American saxophonists